Platinum diselenide is a transition metal dichalcogenide with the formula PtSe2. It is a layered substance that can be split into layers down to three atoms thick. PtSe2 can behave as a metalloid or as a semiconductor depending on the thickness.

Synthesis
Minozzi was the first to report synthesising platinum diselenide from the elements in 1909.

Platinum diselenide can be formed by heating thin foils of platinum in selenium vapour at 400 °C.

A platinum 111 surface exposed to selenium vapour at 270 °C forms a monolayer of PtSe2.

In addition to these selenization methods, PtSe2 can be made by precipitation in water solution of Pt(IV) treated with hydrogen selenide, or by heating platinum tetrachloride with elemental selenium.

Natural occurrence
Platinum diselenide occurs naturally as the mineral Sudovikovite. It was named after Russian petrologist, N.G. Sudovikov who lived from 1903 to 1966. The mineral's hardness is 2 to 2. Sudovikovite was found in the Srednyaya Padma mine, Velikaya Guba uranium-vanadium deposit, Zaonezhie peninsula, Karelia Republic, Russia.

Properties
Platinum diselenide forms crystals in the cadmium iodide structure.  This means that the substance forms layers. Each of the monolayers has a central bed of platinum atoms, with a sheet of selenium atoms above and below. This structure is also called "1T" and has an trigonal structure. The layers are only weakly bonded together, and it is possible to exfoliate layers to bilayers or monolayers.

In bulk the material is semi-metallic, but when reduced to few layers it becomes a semiconductor. The conductivity of the bulk material is 620,000 S/m.

The XPS spectrum shows a peak at 72.3 eV from Pt 4f core, and also has peaks from Pt 5p3/2 and Se 3d3/2 and 3d5/2 at 55.19and 54.39 eV.

Phonon vibrations are designated by the infrared active A2u (Se vibrating out of plane opposite to Pt),  Eu (in layer vibration, Se opposite to Pt),  and Raman active A1g (Se top and bottom atoms moving out of plane in opposite directions 205 cm−1), and Eg (In plane, top and bottom Se atoms moving opposite 175 cm−1). In the Raman spectrum, the A1g is lessened when stimulated emissions polarised perpendicular to the incoming rays are measured. The Eg mode is red-shifted when more layers are stacked. (166 cm−1 for bilayer and 155 cm−1 for bulk material) The A1g emission only has a slight change when thickness varies.

The band gap is calculated as 1.2 eV for monolayers, and 0.21 eV for bilayers. For a trylayer or thicker the substance loses a bandgap and becomes semimetallic.

PtSe2 can change its conductance in the presence of particular gases, such as nitrogen dioxide. Within a few seconds, NO2 absorbs on the surface of the PtSe2 material and lowers the resistance. When the gas is absent, high resistance returns again in about a minute.

The Seebeck coefficient of PtSe2 is 40 μV/K.

Although pristine platinum diselenide is nonmagnetic, the presence of platinum vacancies and strain were predicted to induce magnetism. Later magneto-transport studies  have indeed shown that defective PtSe2 exhibits magnetic properties. Due to RKKY interaction between magnetic Pt-vacancies, this results in layer-dependent ferromagnetic or anti-ferromagnetic behavior.

Monolayers of platinum diselenide show helical spin texture, which is not expected for centrosymmetric materials such as this. This property could be due to a local dipole induced Rashba effect. It means that PtSe2 is a potential spintronics material.

Reactions
Water can physisorb to the surface of platinum diselenide with an energy of −0.19 eV, and similarly for oxygen with energy −0.13 eV. Water and oxygen do not react at toom temperature, because significant energy would be required to break apart the molecules.

Comparison
Palladium diselenide has a different modified pyrite structure. Palladium ditelluride has a similar structure to platinum diselenide. Platinum disulfide is a semiconductor, and platinum ditelluride is metallic in nature.

More complex substances with platinum and selenium also exist, including the quaternary chalcogenides Rb2Pt3USe6 and Cs2Pt3USe6

Jacutingaite is a ternary platinum selenide HgPtSe3.

Use
Platinum diselenide can be utilized for boardband photodetector up to mid-infrared (MIR) region with stability in ambient condition. Also it can work as a catalyst, and can be built into field effect transistors.

Combined with graphene it can be a photocatalyst, converting water and oxygen to reactive hydroxyl radical and superoxide. This reaction works when photons produce holes and electrons. The holes can neutralise hydroxide to make hydroxyl, and the electrons attach to oxygen to make superoxide. These reactive species can mineralise organic matter.

References

Transition metal dichalcogenides
Selenium(−II) compounds
Selenides,2